The Chiesa del Purgatorio (Church of the Purgatory) is a Baroque-style, Roman Catholic church in the town of Venafro, province of Isernia, region of Molise, Italy.

History
The church was built in 1722 outside the gate for the marketplace, such that merchants and buyers could pray without having to enter the city. The tall facade has three orders. The layout is that of a Greek cross, and has a clock on the facade. 
In 1984, after the earthquake, it was closed to worship and only re-opened in 1994.

References

Roman Catholic churches in Venafro
Roman Catholic churches completed in 1722
18th-century Roman Catholic church buildings in Italy
1722 establishments in Italy